The Hall Cabin, also known as the J. H. Kress Cabin is a historic log cabin in Great Smoky Mountains National Park, about  from Fontana, North Carolina. The gable ends of the roof are sheathed in board-and-batten siding. It was built by a man named Hall in 1910, and underwent some remodeling around 1940 when J. H. Kress used it as a hunting lodge. It is located in the drainage of Hazel Creek, an area which historically had a small population and was abandoned after the construction of Fontana Lake and the national park. It is the only structure remaining in its immediate vicinity.

The cabin was listed on the National Register of Historic Places in 1976.

See also
National Register of Historic Places listings in Swain County, North Carolina
National Register of Historic Places listings in Great Smoky Mountains National Park

References

Houses on the National Register of Historic Places in North Carolina
Houses completed in 1910
Houses in Swain County, North Carolina
National Register of Historic Places in Swain County, North Carolina
National Register of Historic Places in Great Smoky Mountains National Park